Natalia Peluso (born 12 January 1995), known professionally as Nathy Peluso, is an Argentinian singer, songwriter, dancer and pedagogue. Born in Argentina and raised in Spain, Peluso became interested in the performing arts at an early age, performing cover songs at musical bars in her teenage years. After graduating King Juan Carlos University, Peluso relocated to Barcelona to pursue a professional career in music, with her first releases Esmeralda (2017) and La Sandunguera (2018) being confected independently. Peluso slowly started to become recognized in Spain. After signing Sony Music, she started working on her breakthrough album Calambre (2020) for which she won the Latin Grammy Award for Best Alternative Music Album.

Distinguished for her theatrical personality onstage, and her fusion of hip hop, soul, and world music, Peluso's popularity expanded after collaborating with Bizarrap on "Nasty Girl", achieving commercial success and social media virality in Latin America. She has also collaborated with Christina Aguilera, Karol G, and C. Tangana, with the latter one's duet "Ateo" debuting atop the Spanish charts.

Peluso's artistry has been awarded four Premios Gardel and a Latin Grammy Award out of six nominations, including Best New Artist, among many others.

Early life 
Peluso was born in 1995 in Luján, Argentina and was raised in the Saavedra neighbourhood in Buenos Aires. While growing up she listened to a variety of artists like Ella Fitzgerald and Ray Charles, as well as artists such as João Gilberto, Ray Barretto or Atahualpa Yupanqui. She has Italian ancestry.

In 2004, at 9 she emigrated to Spain with her family. She first resided in Alicante. At the age of 16, she began to perform at hotels and restaurants in Torrevieja, mainly performing classic songs by Frank Sinatra, Etta James or Nina Simone. As a teenager she began uploading versions to her YouTube channel. She moved to Murcia shortly after, where she entered the city's local university to study a degree in Audiovisual Communication. After leaving the degree program, she moved to Madrid to study Fine Arts at the King Juan Carlos University. She specialized in Pedagogy of Visual Arts and Dance. While studying, she worked in the hospitality industry as a waitress at VIPS and Domino's Pizza, among others. After leaving her studies, she moved to Barcelona, where she currently resides.

In 2017 she began to dedicate herself completely to music with the release of her first mixtape Esmeralda.

Career

2017–2018: First releases 

In October 2017, Peluso independently released a seven-track extended play titled Esmeralda, which included the single "Corashe". The track aroused the interest of many music critics and independent music magazines like Mondo Sonoro and Rockdelux.

In April 2018, she released a second EP, La Sandunguera, with Everlasting Records, which spawned the singles "La Sandunguera" and "Estoy Triste". She later embarked on a tour with her band Big Menu that had over a hundred concerts, including gigs at BBK Live, Sónar and the Festival Internacional de Benicàssim. The tour visited Spain and selected parts of Europe and Latin America. She was nominated at the Independent Music Awards (MIN) for Song of the Year and Best Music Video for "La Sandunguera" She also received the Discovery Artist award at the Latin Alternative Music Conference in New York City.

In 2019 she released her debut book "Deja Que te Combata", a compilation of her thoughts, reflections, stories and past and upcoming projects. During that year she continued promoting herself through new releases like "Natikillah" and appearances at major festivals such as Primavera Sound. She also partnered with Samsung to be part of their Somos Smart Girl campaign alongside Blanca Suárez, Sandra Barneda and Carolina Marín.

2019–present: Calambre 

In December 2019, Peluso signed a record deal with Sony Music Spain. Her first release as a signed artist was the independent single "Copa Glasé".

In 2020 she reached the attention of the general public and the mainstream audience after Operación Triunfo contestant Anaju sang "La Sandunguera" on prime time to keep participating on the show. After that, Peluso was invited to the show on Women's Day to promote her new single "Business Woman", defined as a feminist anthem. During the peak of the COVID-19 pandemic, Peluso released a musical collaboration with urbano artist Rels B titled "No Se Perdona", which had great commercial success. Another single "Buenos Aires" was released shortly after. It received critical acclaim for its message and sound and scored a Latin Grammy nomination for Best Alternative Song. She also received a Premio Gardel and a Latin Grammy nomination for Best New Artist. She was also covered in The Guardian for the first time.

In September 2020 she announced that she would be releasing her debut studio album Calambre on 2 October and released a new single "Sana Sana". Briefly before releasing her album, her performance of "Sana Sana" at the German music platform Colors "which features exceptional talent from around the world" went viral on Twitter, reaching over twelve million views. Calambre was released to critical and commercial success, peaking at number five on the PROMUSICAE album chart. The album was later nominated for Album of the Year at the Premios Gardel (the Argentine equivalent to the Grammy Awards) as well as for Best Alternative Pop Album. Its single "Buenos Aires" also received a nomination for Record of the Year. In November she collaborated with Argentine producer Bizarrap in "Bzrp Music Sessions Vol. 36", which eventually became viral due to its lyrics and instrumentation, reaching the top 5 on the Argentina Hot 100. It is certified platinum in Spain. The rap session received three Premios Gardel nominations, one of them being Song of the Year.

In 2021, the music video for her next single "Delito", directed by Agustín Puente, met praise from critics. The song became a top 30 hit both in Argentina and Spain and was certified Gold in the latter one. Later in March, she received critical acclaim for her performance of "La Violetera" at the 35th Goya Awards. That same month, she collaborated with Karol G on "Gato Malo", included in the Colombian's third studio album and sparked rumors about a possible future collaboration with J Balvin. In May, the singer embarked on her first major tour in Spain, which lasted until fall comprising 28 concerts. On July 3, 2021, Nathy Peluso announced her first solo single since the release of her debut album, titled "Mafiosa", which peaked at 89 in Spain. In September, she took part in the Spotify Singles song series in which she covered "La Despedida" by Daddy Yankee to critical acclaim. The following month, she collaborated with C. Tangana on his song "Ateo" (which became Peluso's first number one single in Spain) and was featured on Christina Aguilera's "Pa Mis Muchachas" alongside Becky G and Nicki Nicole. In December, Peluso reinterprated Camilo Sesto's "Vivir Así es Morir de Amor" to great commercial success.

In February 2022, Peluso released "Emergencia" in collaboration with PlayStation. The single was inspired by the game Horizon Forbidden West. In the video clip, Peluso takes on the aesthetics of Aloy, the video game's main character. The single was produced by Didi Gutman and ODDLIQUOR, while the music video was directed by The Movement.

Discography

Studio albums

Mixtapes

Extended plays

Singles

As lead artist

As featured artist

Other charted and certified songs

Awards and nominations 

Note:
 At the 23rd Annual Gardel Awards, for Calambre, Rafa Arcaute was nominated for Producer of the Year while Albert Romagosa was nominated for Best Cover Design.

References 

1995 births
21st-century Argentine women singers
Argentine women singer-songwriters
Sony Music Spain artists
Living people
People from Luján, Buenos Aires
Singers from Buenos Aires
Women in Latin music
Latin Grammy Award winners
Argentine emigrants to Spain
Latin music songwriters
Argentine expatriates in Spain